Bashir Varaev (also spelled Varayev, born 23 February 1964) is a Chechen judoka who competed for the Soviet Union in the 1988 Summer Olympics.

In 1988 he won the bronze medal in the half middleweight class.

References

External links
 

1964 births
Living people
Russian male judoka
Soviet male judoka
Olympic judoka of the Soviet Union
Judoka at the 1988 Summer Olympics
Olympic bronze medalists for the Soviet Union
Olympic medalists in judo
Chechen martial artists
Russian people of Chechen descent
Medalists at the 1988 Summer Olympics
Goodwill Games medalists in judo
People from Grozny
Competitors at the 1990 Goodwill Games